Hudson Corner is an unincorporated community in Somerset County, Maryland, United States. Hudson Corner is located at the intersection of Maryland Route 667 and Old Westover Marion Road, northeast of Marion Station.

References

Unincorporated communities in Somerset County, Maryland
Unincorporated communities in Maryland